Ember is Turkish director Zeki Demirkubuz's 11th film and is featured in the International Golden Tulip Competition. Shooting began in February 2015 in various districts of Istanbul, especially Eyüp and Güzeltepe. The Turkish-German co-production stars Taner Birsel, Aslıhan Gürbüz, Caner Cindoruk, İştar Gökseven, Talha Yayıkçı, Dolunay Soysert and Çağlar Çorumlu in the leading roles. The film was selected to be screened in the Contemporary World Cinema section at the 2016 Toronto International Film Festival.

Cast 
 Aslıhan Gürbüz as Emine
 Caner Cindoruk as Cemal
 Taner Birsel as Ziya

References

External links
 

2016 films
Turkish drama films
Films directed by Zeki Demirkubuz